DYSM (972 AM) Aksyon Radyo is a radio station owned and operated by Manila Broadcasting Company through its licensee Cebu Broadcasting Company. The station's studio is located at #102 National Highway, Brgy. Cawayan, Catarman, Northern Samar.

On December 17, 2015, DYSM's transmitter was knocked down by Typhoon Melor (Nona).

References

Radio stations established in 1998
Radio stations in Northern Samar